Aliabad-e Sarhadi (also Romanized as ‘Alīābād-e Sarḥadī) is a village in Gafr and Parmon Rural District, Gafr and Parmon District, Bashagard County, Hormozgan Province, Iran. At the 2006 census, its population was 72, in 17 families.

References 

Populated places in Bashagard County